Kudinovsky is a rural locality (a khutor) in Samolshinskoye Rural Settlement, Alexeyevsky District, Volgograd Oblast, Russia. The population was 11 in 2010.

Geography 
Samolshinsky is the nearest rural locality.

References 

Rural localities in Alexeyevsky District, Volgograd Oblast